Goodbye, Sarah Jane Smith is the sixth and final serial of the fourth series of the British science fiction television series The Sarah Jane Adventures. It first aired in two parts on CBBC on 15 and 16 November 2010.

Plot
Ruby White is a Qetesh, an alien that feeds on the heightened emotions of people. She was exiled and imprisoned by her race, and she reprogrammed the holographic entertainment system on board called Mr White to make the prison her spaceship. Ruby moves into Sarah Jane's neighbourhood, and uses Mr White to fake saving the day by apparently destroying a crashed meteor with germs inside. Every time Ruby encounters Sarah Jane she weakens her and causes her memories to fail to the point where she is unfit to save the world.

Sarah Jane hands over her attic and alien technology to Ruby, which Ruby also intends to use to monitor alien incursions. Instead of fighting aliens, she would feast on the humans' emotions by helping aliens cause their suffering and destruction. Ruby teleports Sarah Jane to her cellar and causes her to weaken further when Ruby's stomach, a separate entity to her human form, absorbs more of her life force. When Clyde is suspicious of Ruby's cover story of Sarah Jane leaving so quickly, Ruby teleports him to her ship, which has limited oxygen.

Rani has a phone call with Luke and K9, who use the proximity of Rani's phone to Mr White to reset Mr White's functions and save Clyde. Luke then uses holograms to make meteors visible to everyone on Earth, overloading the capacity of Ruby's ability to absorb emotions, and restoring Sarah Jane's life force to normal. Ruby is returned to her prison; the gravity lock is disengaged, sending her hurtling towards the sun.

Production
This story was the last to air before the death of Elisabeth Sladen.

Writers Gareth Roberts and Clayton Hickman wrote Goodbye, Sarah Jane Smith as a replacement for their earlier attempt at a sequel to the Doctor Who story Planet of the Spiders (1974), which featured Sarah Jane Smith. Roberts and Hickman were assigned to the Spiders sequel after the previously assigned writer, script editor Gary Russell, could not make it work. When Roberts and Hickman could not make the Spiders sequel work either, they then replaced it with Goodbye, Sarah Jane Smith. Roberts and Hickman just used one element from the Spiders sequel outlines on Goodbye, Sarah Jane Smith, namely Sarah Jane's tiredness and forgetfulness.

References

External links

2010 British television episodes
The Sarah Jane Adventures episodes
Films with screenplays by Gareth Roberts (writer)